The 1993–94 Sporting de Gijón season was the 32nd season of the club in La Liga, the 18th consecutive after its last promotion.

Overview
On 16 January 1994, in a rainy evening, Real Sporting defeated Osasuna by 7–1, becoming its largest win in La Liga ever. Xavier Escaich scored four goals.

Squad

Competitions

La Liga

Results by round

League table

Matches

Copa del Rey

Matches

Squad statistics

Appearances and goals

|}

References

External links
Profile at BDFutbol
Official website

1993-94
Sporting de Gijon